Phạm Thanh Tiệp (born 16 March 1996) is a Slovak footballer who plays as a midfielder for V.League 1 side Hong Linh Ha Tinh.

Career

Before the 2019 season, Phạm signed for Vietnamese side Đà Nẵng after playing for Baník Lehota pod Vtáčnikom in the Slovak fifth division.

References

External links
 

Slovak footballers
Expatriate footballers in Vietnam
V.League 1 players
Slovak expatriate footballers
Slovak people of Vietnamese descent
SHB Da Nang FC players
FC Baník Prievidza players
1996 births
Living people
Association football midfielders
Sportspeople from Banská Bystrica